Sleep is a monthly peer-reviewed medical journal covering research on sleep. Topics include basic and neuroscience studies of sleep, in vitro and animal models of sleep, studies in clinical or population samples, clinical trials, and epidemiologic studies. It is the official journal of the Sleep Research Society. The journal was established in 1978 and the editor-in-chief is Ronald Szymusiak (University of California, Los Angeles).

Abstracting and indexing
The journal is abstracted and indexed in:

According to the Journal Citation Reports, the journal has a 2017 impact factor of 5.135.

References

External links
 

Sleep medicine journals
Oxford University Press academic journals
Monthly journals
English-language journals
Delayed open access journals
Publications established in 1978